Harry Haslam may refer to:

Harry Haslam (footballer, born 1921) (1921–1986), English footballer and manager
Harry Haslam (footballer, born 1875) (1875–1943), English footballer
Harry Haslam (field hockey) (1883–1955), English Olympic field hockey player
Harry O. Haslam (1874–1945), member of the Legislative Assembly of Alberta

See also
Harry Hallam, English football manager